Kalu Uche (born 15 November 1982) is a Nigerian professional footballer who plays as a forward.

He spent most of his career in Spain, mainly with Almería, with which he amassed La Liga totals of 117 matches and 27 goals (212 appearances and 45 goals all competitions comprised). He also competed professionally in Poland, France, Switzerland, Turkey, Qatar and India.
	
A Nigeria international in the 2000s, Uche represented his country at the 2010 World Cup and the 2010 Africa Cup of Nations.

Club career

Early years
Born in Aba, Abia, Uche's career began in Nigeria with Enyimba International F.C. and Iwuanyanwu Nationale. In the 2000–01 season he joined RCD Espanyol B in Spain, failing to receive any first-team opportunities and competing with the reserves in the third division.

Uche then transferred to Wisła Kraków, playing there until 2005 – winning the Ekstraklasa three times and Polish Cup twice – except for the 2004–05 campaign when he represented FC Girondins de Bordeaux, on loan.

Almería
For 2005–06, Uche moved to UD Almería, and was instrumental in helping the Andalusia club to its first ever La Liga promotion in his second year, scoring eight league goals (with three in the last five matches). He made his debut in the competition on 26 August 2007, coming from the bench in a 3–0 away win against Deportivo de La Coruña.

On 11 January 2009, profiting from the absence of first-choice Álvaro Negredo, Uche netted both goals in a 2–2 draw at Espanyol. On 5 December, he scored his team's second goal at Real Madrid for the 2–1, but the hosts eventually rallied back to 4–2.

In the following summer, Negredo was sold to Sevilla FC – via Real Madrid – and Uche became Almería's most important attacking reference. He finished the 2009–10 season with a career-best in Spain nine goals, including a brace on 4 May 2010 against Villarreal CF in a 4–2 home win, which all but certified permanence in the top level for another year.

Uche was only available to manager Juan Manuel Lillo one month into 2010–11, due to fitness problems. In the second match upon his return, on 26 September 2010, he scored twice in a 2–0 victory at Deportivo for Almería's first win of the campaign, going on to net seven in 32 games as the club was finally relegated after a four-year stay.

Neuchâtel and Espanyol
On 4 August 2011, Uche joined Swiss Super League side Neuchâtel Xamax on a two-year deal. He left the following transfer window, however, and returned to Espanyol, immerse in a deep injury crisis to its attacking line, signing until June 2013.

Uche opened his scoring account for his new club on 25 February 2012 in a 1–2 home loss against Levante UD. On 11 March, he put three past Rayo Vallecano in another home fixture (5–1).

Late career
On 20 July 2012, Uche moved to Turkish club Kasımpaşa SK, signing a three-year contract. On 1 October of the following year he switched teams and countries again, penning a deal with El Jaish SC in Qatar.

Uche signed an 18-month contract with Levante UD on 29 January 2015, after a short stint at Al Rayyan SC. On 7 January 2016, he returned to Almería, after spending six months at FC Pune City. He began his third spell at the former club in February 2017, joining until 30 June as a free agent.

International career
Uche made his debut for Nigeria on 21 June 2003, in an African Nations Cup qualifier against Angola, scoring in the process. He represented the nation at the 2010 Africa Cup of Nations, going scoreless for the eventual third-placed team.

After a solid club season, Uche was picked for that year's FIFA World Cup in South Africa. On 17 June, against Greece, he opened the score from a free kick, but the Super Eagles soon were reduced to ten men and lost 1–2. In the third and last game he also scored the opener, eventually earning Nigeria's only point in the competition in a 2–2 draw with South Korea.

International goals

Personal life
Uche's younger brother, Ikechukwu Uche, is also a footballer. Also a forward, he too spent most of his senior career in Spain (they are not related to two other players, Uche Okechukwu and Ikechukwu Kalu).

Honors
Wisła Kraków
Ekstraklasa: 2000–01, 2002–03, 2003–04

Nigeria
Africa Cup of Nations third place: 2010

References

External links
NigerianPlayers profile

1982 births
Living people
People from Aba, Abia
Nigerian footballers
Association football midfielders
Association football forwards
Nigeria Professional Football League players
Enyimba F.C. players
Heartland F.C. players
La Liga players
Segunda División players
Segunda División B players
RCD Espanyol B footballers
UD Almería players
RCD Espanyol footballers
Levante UD footballers
Ekstraklasa players
Wisła Kraków players
Ligue 1 players
FC Girondins de Bordeaux players
Swiss Super League players
Neuchâtel Xamax FCS players
Süper Lig players
Kasımpaşa S.K. footballers
Qatar Stars League players
Qatari Second Division players
El Jaish SC players
Al-Rayyan SC players
Indian Super League players
FC Pune City players
Odisha FC players
ATK (football club) players
Nigeria international footballers
2010 FIFA World Cup players
2010 Africa Cup of Nations players
Nigerian expatriate footballers
Expatriate footballers in Spain
Expatriate footballers in Poland
Expatriate footballers in France
Expatriate footballers in Switzerland
Expatriate footballers in Turkey
Expatriate footballers in Qatar
Expatriate footballers in India
Nigerian expatriate sportspeople in Spain
Nigerian expatriate sportspeople in Poland
Nigerian expatriate sportspeople in France
Nigerian expatriate sportspeople in Turkey
Nigerian expatriate sportspeople in Qatar
Nigerian expatriate sportspeople in India